is a railway station in Suzuka, Mie Prefecture, Japan, operated by Ise Railway. The station is 3.8 rail kilometers from the terminus of the line at Kawarada Station.

History
Suzuka Station opened on September 1, 1973 as a station on the Japan National Railways (JNR) Ise Line. The Ise Line was privatized on March 27, 1987, four days before the dissolution of the JNR on April 1, 1987.

Line
Ise Railway Ise Line

Station layout
Suzuka Station has two elevated opposed side platforms.

Platforms

Adjacent stations 

|-
!colspan=5|Ise Railway

External links

 Ise Railway Official home page 

Railway stations in Japan opened in 1973
Railway stations in Mie Prefecture